The canton of Desvres  is a canton situated in the department of the Pas-de-Calais and in the Hauts-de-France region of northern France. The canton is organised around Desvres in the arrondissement of Boulogne-sur-Mer.

Composition
At the French canton reorganisation which came into effect in March 2015, the canton was expanded from 23 to 52 communes:

Alincthun
Ambleteuse
Audembert
Audinghen
Audresselles
Bazinghen
Bellebrune
Belle-et-Houllefort
Beuvrequen
Bournonville
Brunembert
Carly
Colembert
Courset
Crémarest
Desvres
Doudeauville
Ferques
Halinghen
Henneveux
Hervelinghen
Lacres
Landrethun-le-Nord
Leubringhen
Leulinghen-Bernes
Longfossé
Longueville
Lottinghen
Maninghen-Henne
Marquise
Menneville
Nabringhen
Offrethun
Quesques
Questrecques
Rety
Rinxent
Saint-Inglevert
Saint-Martin-Choquel
Samer
Selles
Senlecques
Tardinghen
Tingry
Verlincthun
Vieil-Moutier
Wacquinghen
Le Wast
Wierre-au-Bois
Wierre-Effroy
Wirwignes  
Wissant

Population

See also 
Cantons of Pas-de-Calais 
Communes of Pas-de-Calais 
Arrondissements of the Pas-de-Calais department

References

Desvres